Sphaerulariidae is a family of nematodes belonging to the order Tylenchida.

Genera:
 Prothallonema Christie, 1938
 Sphaerularia Dufour, 1837
 Tripius Chitwood, 1935
 Veleshkinema

References

Nematodes